This is the discography of American hip hop musician Mo B. Dick.

Albums

Studio albums

Compilation albums

Soundtrack albums

Mixtapes

Instrumental albums

Extended plays

Singles

As lead artist

As featured artist

Soundtrack appearances

References

Discographies of American artists
Hip hop discographies